Joseph Mills  (birth unknown – death unknown) was an English rugby union footballer who played in the 1870s, 1880s and 1890s. He played at representative level for Lancashire (captain), and at club level for Swinton (captain). Prior to Tuesday 2 June 1896, Swinton were a rugby union club.

Playing career

County honours
Joe Mills won caps for Lancashire (captain) while at Swinton. He was selected for The North of England versus The South of England, and he was twice named a reserve for England.

Outside of rugby
Joe Mills was the landlord of the Bull's Head pub on Chorley Road, Swinton.

References

External links
Search for "Mills" at espnscrum.com
Photograph 'Swinton 1882-83' at swintonlionstales.co.uk
Photograph 'Swinton 1886' at swintonlionstales.co.uk

English rugby union players
Lancashire County RFU players
Place of birth missing
Place of death missing
Publicans
Swinton Lions players
Year of birth missing
Year of death missing